Max Rée (7 October 1889 – 7 March 1953) was a Danish architect, costume designer, scene designer, and art director who worked in both theatre and film. He won an Academy Award for Best Art Direction for the film Cimarron. He was born in Copenhagen, Denmark and died in Los Angeles, California.

Selected filmography
 The Private Life of Helen of Troy (1927)
 Love and the Devil (1929)
 The Gay Diplomat (1931)
 White Shoulders (1931)
 Cimarron (1931)
 The Lost Squadron (1932)
 A Midsummer Night's Dream (1935)
 Stagecoach (1939)

References

External links

1889 births
1953 deaths
Danish art directors
Costume designers
People from Copenhagen
Best Art Direction Academy Award winners
Deaths from cancer in California